Fagrie Lakay (born 31 May 1997) is a South African soccer player who plays as a forward for Egyptian Premier League club Pyramids FC and South Africa national team.

Career
He was born in Manenberg.

Lakay started playing soccer for Real Stars, a team that was owned by his father. He later saw an advert for Santos trials and his father took him there. Lakay made his debut for Santos in the National First Division on 20 October 2012 against FC Cape Town. He started and played the first half as Santos drew the match 0–0. He then scored his first career goal on 5 February 2014 against Maluti FET College in which his 39th-minute strike gave Santos a 2–0 lead. However, FET College came back to draw the game 2–2.

International
Lakay has played for South Africa at the under-17 and under-20 teams. Lakay scored in a training match for Santos against the senior national team's fringe players, beating under-20 teammate Dumisani Msibi in goal from 40m, ahead of South Africa's qualifier against Nigeria in Cape Town. He made his senior debut for South Africa on 30 November 2014 when the country took on the Ivory Coast. He came on as a 75th-minute substitute for Themba Zwane as South Africa won 2–0. By making his debut, Lakay at 17 years, 5 months, 30 days, broke the record set by Rivaldo Coetzee as the youngest ever player to wear the national jersey at 17 years, 11 months, 25 days. Coetzee also broke a long-standing record by former Bafana captain Aaron Mokoena who was 18 years, two months, 26 days in a clash against Botswana in 1999.

Career statistics

Others

References

External links

1997 births
Living people
South African soccer players
Santos F.C. (South Africa) players
SuperSport United F.C. players
Cape Town Spurs F.C. players
Bidvest Wits F.C. players
Association football midfielders
National First Division players
South African Premier Division players
Cape Town City F.C. (2016) players
South Africa youth international soccer players